Maxwell Creek is a stream in the municipality of Chatham-Kent in Southwestern Ontario, Canada. It is part of the Great Lakes Basin and is a left tributary of the Chenail Ecarté (The Snye).

The Chenail Ecarté (The Skye) flows via Lake St. Clair and the Detroit River to Lake Erie.

References

Rivers of Chatham-Kent